The Nichol House is a historic house at 205 Park Place in Pine Bluff, Arkansas.  It is a two-story wood-frame structure, its exterior finished in a combination of brick veneer and stucco. A single-story shed-roofed porch extends across the front, supported by brick piers, with a second-story enclosed porch above the right side.  Gable ends feature large Craftsman brackets and exposed rafter ends.  The house was designed by Charles L. Thompson and was built in 1916 for a local banker.

The house was listed on the National Register of Historic Places in 1993.

See also
National Register of Historic Places listings in Jefferson County, Arkansas

References

Houses completed in 1916
Houses in Pine Bluff, Arkansas
Houses on the National Register of Historic Places in Arkansas
National Register of Historic Places in Pine Bluff, Arkansas
Prairie School architecture